The 2017 World Wrestling Clubs Cup – Men's Greco-Roman was the last of a set of two World Wrestling Clubs Cups in 2017 which were held in Isfahan, Iran on 14–15 December 2017.

Pool stage

Pool A

Pool B

Pool C

Pool D

Next level

Final ranking

See also 
 2017 Wrestling World Cup - Men's Greco-Roman
 2017 Wrestling World Cup - Men's freestyle

References

clubs, 2017
World Wrestling Clubs Cup
Wrestling
International wrestling competitions hosted by Iran
Sport in Tehran
Wrestling